Thiago Gomes, full name Thiago Gomes Antequeira, (born 17 February 1982 in São Paulo city, São Paulo), is a Brazilian football player at the position of defender who played for several Brazilian clubs.

Career
It was revealed by the basic categories of Palmeiras, where he worked professionally between 2006 and 2007. In 2007, after the arrival of coach Caio Junior, was eventually loaned to America RN, returning after being injured at Christmas time.

Also in 2007, after recovering from injury, had no space with coach Caio Jr, and borrow again, this time for the CRB of Alagoas, where he helped the team in Serie B, playing six games and scoring one goal.

In 2008, Palmeiras lends it again now for Guaratinguetá Paulistão to dispute that with an excellent and surprising campaign ends the qualifying round in first place, losing the semifinal to Ponte Preta.

At the end of the state, is again borrow now to Victoria to compete in the Brasileirão. In 2009, Palm has chosen to keep him on loan to Victoria.

Largely untapped in the team Bahia, Thiago went to Portugal.

External links
 

1982 births
Living people
Brazilian footballers
Association football defenders
Sociedade Esportiva Palmeiras players
Guaratinguetá Futebol players
Esporte Clube Vitória players
Ituano FC players
Clube de Regatas Brasil players
Al-Wehda Club (Mecca) players
Saudi Professional League players
Footballers from São Paulo